James Willard Ragsdale (December 14, 1872 – July 23, 1919) was a U.S. Representative from South Carolina.

Born in Timmonsville, South Carolina, Ragsdale attended the public schools.
He was employed in a railroad office at Wilmington, North Carolina, for several years.
He attended the University of South Carolina at Columbia.
He studied law.
He was admitted to the bar in 1898 and commenced practice in Florence, South Carolina.
He engaged in agricultural pursuits and banking.
Trustee of the South Carolina Industrial School.
He served as member of the State house of representatives 1899-1900.
He served as member of the State senate 1902-1904.
He was an unsuccessful candidate for attorney general of South Carolina and for election in 1910 to the Sixty-second Congress.

Ragsdale was elected as a Democrat to the Sixty-third and to the three succeeding Congresses and served from March 4, 1913, until his death in Washington, D.C., July 23, 1919.
He was interred in Mount Hope Cemetery, Florence, South Carolina.

See also
List of United States Congress members who died in office (1900–49)

Sources

 J. Willard Ragsdale, late a representative from South Carolina, Memorial addresses delivered in the House of Representatives and Senate frontispiece 1921

1872 births
1919 deaths
People from Timmonsville, South Carolina
Democratic Party members of the United States House of Representatives from South Carolina
Democratic Party members of the South Carolina House of Representatives
Democratic Party South Carolina state senators
19th-century American politicians
University of South Carolina alumni